Cochylimorpha agenjoi is a species of moth of the family Tortricidae. It is found in Spain.

The wingspan is about 16 mm. Adults have been recorded on wing in July.

References

Moths described in 1963
Cochylimorpha
Moths of Europe